Richard Mason may refer to:

Writers
 Richard Mason (novelist, 1919–1997), English author of The World of Suzie Wong
 Richard Mason (novelist, born 1977), English writer, the author of The Drowning People
 Richard Mason (Welsh author) (1816–1881), printer and author

Others
 Richard Mason (historian) (1934–2009), also known as R.H.P. Mason
 Richard Mason (politician) (c. 1633–1685), British Member of Parliament
 Richard Mason (explorer) (1935–1961), British explorer
 Richard Mason (film producer) (1926–2002), Australian 
 Angelus of St. Francis Mason (1599–1678), English Franciscan friar, born Richard Mason
 Richard Barnes Mason (1797–1850), military governor of California
 Richard Chichester Mason (1793–1869), American physician and Confederate States Army serviceman
 Richard Nelson Mason (1876–1940), American educator and businessperson
 Richard Mason Rocca, Italian-American basketball player
 Richard Mason (RAF officer), British air commodore
 Richard Mason (priest) (1929–1997), Anglican clergyman